Jaszczurka (meaning "lizard" in Polish) is the first studio album by Polish trip hop singer Pati Yang. The album was released by Sony Music Poland on 1 June 1998.

Track listing

Pati Yang albums
1998 albums